Bence is a Hungarian male given name, derived from the Latin verb vincere, meaning "to conquer" or "to win". Bence is also used as a surname in several cultures. The name may refer to:

Given name
Bence Balogh (born 1991), Hungarian football player
Bence Batik (born 1993), Hungarian football player
Bence Biczó (born 1993), Hungarian swimmer 
Bence Bánhidi (born 1995), Hungarian handball player
Bence Bátor (born 1977), Hungarian musician
Bence Deutsch (born 1992), Hungarian football player
Bence Gyurján (born 1992), Hungarian football player
 Bence Halász (born 1997), Hungarian hammer thrower
Bence Horváth (footballer) (born 1986), Hungarian football player
Bence Iszlai (born 1989), Hungarian football player 
Bence Jagodics (born 1994), Hungarian football player
Bence Lenzsér (born 1996), Hungarian football player
Bence Ludánszki (born 1990), Hungarian football player
Bence Mervó (born 1995), Hungarian football player
Bence Nanay (born 1977), Hungarian philosopher
Bence Penke (born 1994), Hungarian actor
Bence Pulai (born 1991), Hungarian swimmer
Bence Pásztor (born 1995), Hungarian hammer thrower
Bence Rakaczki (1993–2014), Hungarian football player 
Bence Rétvári (born 1979), Hungarian politician
Bence Somodi (born 1988), Hungarian football
Bence Szabó (fencer) (born 1962), Hungarian fencer
Bence Szabó (footballer, born 1990) (born 1990), Hungarian football player
Bence Szabolcsi (1899–1973), Hungarian music historian
Bence Zámbó (born 1989), Hungarian football player

Surname
Alexander Bence (1590–1655), English merchant and politician
Alfred Henry Bence (1908–1977), Canadian politician
Amelia Bence (1914–2016), Argentine actress
Brenda Bence (born 1962), American writer
Cyril Bence (1902–1992), British politician
Didier Bence (born 1987), Canadian boxer
György Bence (1941–2006), Hungarian philosopher
John Bence (1622–1688), English merchant and politician 
Léon Bence (1929–1987), French physician
Margarethe Bence (1930-1992), American opera singer
Mark Bence-Jones (1930–2010), British writer
Paul Bence (born 1948), English football player
Peter Bence (born 1991), Hungarian musician
Roy Bence (1900–1979), Australian football player
Squire Bence (1597–1648), English merchant and politician

References

Hungarian masculine given names
English-language surnames